Clàudia Pina Medina (born 12 August 2001) is a Spanish professional footballer who plays as a forward for Liga F club FC Barcelona and the Spain women's national team.

Career

Club

Pina was formerly a futsal player in Montcada before being discovered by Espanyol's scouts in 2011 and subsequently joining their youth team. She moved to Barcelona's infantil-alevín team from Espanyol in 2013, and in her second season, she helped the team to win the youth league championship by scoring 100 goals in her 20 appearances. After proving herself as a technically gifted player and a natural goalscorer she quickly progressed through the different ranks of the youth team. One particular goal she scored after dribbling through four players in the derby against Espanyol in January 2017 trended across the internet.

Pina made her first official appearance for the senior team in January 2018. Thus, being only 16 years and 5 months old at the time, she set the record as the youngest player to have ever played for a senior Barça team in an official match.That record has been beaten by Vicky Lopez, being 16 years,one month and 19 days old, on 17 September 2022.

In the summer of 2020, Pina was sent on loan to Sevilla for one season, alongside Barcelona teammate Carla Armengol, but returned to the Catalan team the following year.

In February 2023, Pina extended her contract with the club until June 2026.

International

Pina was first called up to play for the national U-16 team at the age of 14 by Toña Is. In September 2016 she was invited for the first time to play for Spanish U-17 national team in a UEFA tournament in Příbram, where she scored 5 goals including a hat-trick in her debut match. She later played her first official game for the Spanish U-17 national team in 2016 World Cup against Jordan, scoring a goal in her first appearance.

At the end of 2017 her name was announced as the top UEFA national-team goal scoring player among both female and male players, scoring 16 goals during the year.

On 2021 she made her debut with the senior team in a friendly against Denmark.

Career statistics

Club
.

Honours

Club
Barcelona B
 Segunda División, Group III: 2016–17

FC Barcelona
 Primera División: 2019-20, 2021–22
 Copa de la Reina de Fútbol: 2019-20, 2021-22
 Supercopa Femenina: 2019–20, 2021–22

International

 FIFA U-17 Women's World Cup: Champion in 2018, and third place in 2016
 UEFA Women's Under-17 Championship: Runner-Up: 2017

References

External links
 
 Clàudia Pina at FC Barcelona
 Clàudia Pina at BDFutbol
 
 
 

2001 births
Living people
Spanish women's footballers
Primera División (women) players
FC Barcelona Femení players
Footballers from Catalonia
People from Vallès Occidental
Sportspeople from the Province of Barcelona
Women's association football forwards
Sportswomen from Catalonia
Sevilla FC (women) players
FC Barcelona Femení B players
Segunda Federación (women) players
RCD Espanyol Femenino players
Spain women's international footballers
UEFA Women's Euro 2022 players
Spain women's youth international footballers
21st-century Spanish women